Now Dozu (also Romanized as Now Dozū; also known as Nowdozo) is a village in Qaleh Rural District, in the Central District of Manujan County, Kerman Province, Iran. At the 2006 census, its population was 18, in 4 families.

References 

Populated places in Manujan County